In medicine, aortoiliac occlusive disease is a form of central artery disease involving the blockage of the abdominal aorta as it transitions into the common iliac arteries.

Signs and symptoms
Classically, it is described in male patients as a triad of the following signs and symptoms:
 claudication of the buttocks and thighs
 absent or decreased femoral pulses
 erectile dysfunction

This combination is known as Leriche syndrome.  However, any number of symptoms may present, depending on the distribution and severity of the disease, such as muscle atrophy, slow wound healing in the legs, and critical limb ischemia.

Diagnosis
The physical examination usually shows weakened femoral pulses and a reduced ankle-brachial index. The diagnosis can be verified by color duplex scanning, which reveals either a peak systolic velocity ratio ≥2.5 at the site of stenosis and/or a monophasic waveform. MRA and multidetector CTA are often used to determine the extent and type of obstruction. Another technique is digital subtraction angiography which allows verification of the diagnosis and endovascular treatment in a single session. 
Angiography provides important information regarding the perfusion and patency of distal arteries (e.g. femoral artery). The presence of collateral arteries in the pelvic and groin area is important in maintaining crucial blood flow and lower limb viability. However, angiography should only be used if symptoms warrant surgical intervention.

Treatment
Treatment involves revascularization typically using either angioplasty or a type of vascular bypass
 Kissing balloon angioplasty +/- stent, so named because the two common iliac stents touch each other in the distal aorta.
 Aorto-iliac bypass graft
 Axillary-bi-femoral and femoral-femoral bypass (sometimes abbreviated "ax-fem fem-fem")

History
The condition was first described by Robert Graham in 1914, but the condition with its triad of symptoms was ascribed to René Leriche. Leriche, a French surgeon, linked the pathophysiology with the anatomy of the condition. John Hunter's dissections of atherosclerotic aortic bifurcations from the late 18th century are preserved at the Hunterian Museum, but Leriche was first to publish on the subject based on a patient he treated with the condition at the age of 30. Following treatment the 30-year-old was able to walk without pain and maintain an erection.

See also
 Claudication
 Peripheral arterial disease

References

External links 

Vascular diseases
Medical triads
Syndromes affecting the aorta